Hudderstone is a hill in the Culter Hills range, part of the Southern Uplands of Scotland. Normally ascended as part of a popular round, its southern flanks are dotted with turbines from the Clyde Extension Wind Farm.

References

Donald mountains
Mountains and hills of South Lanarkshire
Mountains and hills of the Southern Uplands